Goera fuscula is a species of caddisfly in the family Goeridae. It is found in North America.

References

External links

 

Integripalpia
Articles created by Qbugbot
Insects described in 1905